Tiempo de Vals is the fifth studio album recorded by Puerto Rican performer Chayanne, It was released by CBS Discos on August 7, 1990 (see 1990 in music). The album was the third released on the Sony Music label, and featured successful singles four singles that reach on Billboard's Hot Latin Tracks chart: "Completamente Enamorados" (that peaked #1 on that chart for five weeks), "Daría Cualquier Cosa", "Simon Sez" (which was the first song by Chayanne ever recorded in English), and "Tiempo de Vals". The song "Soleil, Soleil", is a cover of the song by Scottish pop group Middle of the Road, but with Spanish lyrics. The album sold 1,000,000 copies worldwide.

The titular song "Tiempo de Vals" has become a staple as the opening dance for Quinceañera parties and wedding receptions in Latin America replacing earlier more traditional waltzes.

Track listing

Music videos
Completamente Enamorados
Daría Cualquier Cosa
Simon Sez
Tiempo de Vals

References

1990 albums
Chayanne albums
Spanish-language albums
CBS Discos albums